"Miss You" is the 11th single of Japanese artist Yuna Ito slated for a release on September 3, 2008.

Miss You is currently being used as the Ito En Vitamin Fruit CM song. Miss You was the inspiring song for the cell phone novel .

Track list
 Miss You (Hakuchou Maika)
 Breeeeezin!!!!!!! (Kami Kaoru)
 Urban Mermaid: Bittersweet Movement Blood-I Riddimix
 Miss You (Instrumental)

Magazine promotion
8/9: Pati Pati
8/9: Popeye
8/12: What's In?
8/14: CD Data
8/23: Gekkan Kayou Kyoku
8/27: B-Pass

TV Promotional Performances
08/22 - TV Asahi's Music Station
08/04 - Music Japan
08/05 - Music Fighter

Charts

Digital Sales Charts

Oricon Sales Chart (Japan)

References
 

2008 singles
Yuna Ito songs
2008 songs